Tricolia milaschewitchi is a species of small sea snail with calcareous opercula, a marine gastropod mollusk in the family Phasianellidae, the pheasant snails.

Description
The height of the shell reaches 6 mm.

Distribution
This species occurs in the Black Sea.

Habitat
This species is found in the following habitats:
 Brackish
 Marine

References

External links
 To World Register of Marine Species

Phasianellidae
Gastropods described in 1991